Over the Years is a 2018 retrospective compilation album from Graham Nash. The album consists of two discs, one containing Nash's greatest hits including his work with CSNY, CSN and as a duo with Crosby & Nash.

Track listing

References 

2018 compilation albums
Graham Nash compilation albums